The enzyme propanediol dehydratase catalyzes the chemical reaction

propane-1,2-diol  propanal + H2O

This enzyme belongs to the family of lyases, specifically the hydro-lyases, which cleave carbon-oxygen bonds.  The systematic name of this enzyme class is propane-1,2-diol hydro-lyase (propanal-forming). Other names in common use include meso-2,3-butanediol dehydrase, diol dehydratase, DL-1,2-propanediol hydro-lyase, diol dehydrase, adenosylcobalamin-dependent diol dehydratase, propanediol dehydrase, coenzyme B12-dependent diol dehydrase, 1,2-propanediol dehydratase, dioldehydratase, and propane-1,2-diol hydro-lyase.  This enzyme participates in glycerolipid metabolism.  It employs one cofactor, cobamide.

Structural studies

References

 
 
 

EC 4.2.1
Cobamide enzymes
Enzymes of known structure